Tagbilaran, officially the City of Tagbilaran, is a 3rd class component city and capital of the province of Bohol, Philippines. According to the 2020 census, it has a population of 104,976 people.

Etymology
According to oral tradition, the name is a Hispanicized form of "Tagubilaan", a compound of tagu, meaning "to hide" and "Bilaan", referring to the Blaan people, who were said to have raided the Visayan Islands. This explanation seems to correlate with the government's explanation. According to the official government website of Tagbilaran, it is said to have been derived from tinabilan meaning shielded, as the town was protected by Panglao from potential invaders.

History

A hundred years before Spaniards arrived in the Philippines, the settlement which eventually became Tagbilaran was already involved in trading with China and Malaya. Tagbilaran Strait was the location of the Precolonial kingdom of the Kedatuan of Dapitan. This early settlement had contact with the Spaniards in 1565, when the Spanish conquistador Miguel López de Legazpi and the native chieftain Datu Sikatuna pledged peace and cooperation through the famous blood compact.

(San Jose de) Tagbilaran was established as a town on February 9, 1742, by General Don Francisco Antonio Calderón de la Barca, Governor of the Visayas, who separated it from the town of Baclayon. The town was dedicated to St. Joseph the Worker. Since then it was part of the province of Bohol until it became a chartered city on July 1, 1966, by virtue of Republic Act No. 4660.

The city was occupied by the United States during the Philippine–American War and by Imperial Japan during World War II.

Sitio Ubos (Lower Town) is Tagbilaran's former harbor site and is considered to be the city's oldest portion, having been a busy trading center since the seventeenth century until the early twentieth century. As such, the place houses the oldest and largest number of heritage houses in Bohol. Sitio Ubos declined as a major port towards the end of the Spanish era when the causeway to Panglao Island was constructed. Since then, the area lost its former glory and its old houses were either demolished or neglected.

In 2002, in recognition of its cultural and historic significance, Sitio Ubos was declared a "Cultural Heritage Area". Some of the surviving heritage houses to this day include the Rocha–Suarez House, Rocha House, Hontanosas House, Beldia House, and Yap House.

Historic events

One of the most important events in Philippine history (immortalized on canvas by the famous Filipino painter Juan Luna) was the blood compact between Datu Sikatuna, a local native chieftain, and Captain Miguel López de Legazpi, the Spanish explorer and colonizer. It took place in the coast of Bool, now a district of Tagbilaran, on March 16, 1565, a day after Legazpi and his crew of conquistadores on four ships chanced upon the shores of Bool during their trip to the province of Butuan from Camiguin Island because of strong southwest monsoon winds and low tide.

On that day, March 16, 1565, Legazpi with Fray Andres de Urdaneta and some of his crew set foot on land for an audience with the local chieftain Sikatuna. The two bands of different race and creed met a few hundred meters from the beach and, after a few pleasantries, the Basque seafarer and the chieftain of Bohol sealed and strengthened their treaty of friendship in a historic blood compact. Sikatuna and Legazpi each made a cut on the left arm and collected the drop of blood into a single vessel mixed with wine. A marker now stands on the spot where Sikatuna and Legaspi allegedly sealed that famous compact. To honor this treaty of friendship, president Elpidio Quirino established the "Order of Sikatuna" in 1953, a presidential award and decoration conferred upon visiting dignitaries.

Tagbilaran was occupied by Imperial Japanese forces on May 17, 1942, after the fall of the Philippines during World War II.

During the Japanese occupation, the municipal government of Tagbilaran, whose mayor at the time was Manuel Espuelas, moved from the Poblacion to Tiptip. Another significant event was the Battle of Ubujan wherein a guerrilla unit under the command of Captain Francisco Salazar (aka Vicente Cubello) engaged Japanese troops against overwhelming odds.

2013 earthquake

An earthquake with magnitude 7.2, with an epicenter near Sagbayan, Bohol, struck Bohol on October 15, 2013. Tagbilaran received four fatalities and 21 injuries, and damage to buildings, including the seaport, airport, and city hall.

Geographic

Climate

Barangays

However, 44% of the city's population reside in the four urban districts where trade and commerce are also concentrated.

Demographics

Economy

The city has the advantage of being the province's main business capital and center of governance, education and transportation. Local and international visitors to Bohol pass through the city via the Port of Tagbilaran.

Alturas Group (operator of Alturas Mall, Island City Mall and Plaza Marcela), Bohol Quality Corporation and Alvarez Group are some of the notable locally owned companies based in the city.

Government

Chief Executives since 1742

The city is governed locally by a mayor, although historically by a gobernadorcillo and presidente municipal afterwards.

Tourism

The city is a start-off point to Bohol province's attractions: the Chocolate Hills, tarsiers, white sandy beaches, dive spots, heritage sites and old stone churches. Home to several hotels, resorts, and restaurants, the city has recently become a venue for national conventions and gatherings.

Festivals

'Saulog-Tagbilaran Festival is a celebration every April 20 to May 2. This includes street-dancing, fluvial procession, nightly activities, novena masses and beauty pageant. Tagbilaranon families invite relatives and friends for a lunch or dinner during desperas (visper) and katumanan (grand feast day May 1).

The Sandugo Festival is an annual celebration in Tagbilaran in commemoration of the blood compact between Miguel López de Legazpi and Datu Sikatuna in March 1565. The festival is celebrated every July to coincide with the month-long activities celebrating the city's Charter Day on July 1 and the Province's (Bohol) Day on July 22.

Transportation

Tagbilaran's land network consists of sealed and unsealed roads. Local transport plying the routes within the city are tricycles, multicabs, taxis, and jeepneys. Buses, taxis and vans are usually hired for out-of-town travel. The Integrated Bus Terminal (IBT) located in the city district of Dao serves as the terminal point for public transport vehicles serving the inter-city routes within the province and also serves as the embarkation point for passengers taking the Pan-Philippine Highway (AH26) bus route from Tagbilaran to Metro Manila.  There is also a long-distance bus station within Cogon market.

The city is linked by sea to the major port cities in the Visayas Islands and Mindanao, which of major commercial importance is its link to the regional capital of Cebu City. A fastcraft ferry ride to Cebu City's Pier 1 takes approximately 2 hours depending on weather and sea conditions. The route is served by Ocean Jet, Weesam Express and SuperCat several times daily.

Bohol-Panglao International Airport is situated at the Panglao Island southwest of the city. It replaced Tagbilaran Airport on November 27, 2018. It serves as the principal gateway airport to the rest of the province. Airlines using the airport serve primarily the Tagbilaran-Manila route, Tagbilaran-Clark route, and also Mindanao. The route is served by Cebu Pacific Air, Cebgo, PAL Express, and AirAsia Philippines using Airbus A319, Airbus A320 and ATR 72 planes. Flight time to Manila is approximately 1h:15.

Healthcare
The city is served with a mix of public and private health care institutions that also cater to the health needs of the rest of the province. Complex major cases and services are sent to nearby Cebu City due to limited facilities.

Education

As the capital of Bohol, Tagbilaran is the main center for education in the province. All of the province's universities are located in the city as well as other well-known institutions of learning.

Notable personalities

 Mark Magsayo – Boxer
 José Abueva – Academician
 Napoleon Abueva – Artist
 Czar Amonsot – Boxer
 Rich Asuncion – Starstruck Finalist/TV Actress 
 Maxelende Ganade – Singer-songwriter
 Luke Mejares – TV Personality/Singer
 Cecilio Putong – Secretary of Education (1952)
 Nestor Principe - Martial arts instructor and activist martyred during the Marcos dictatorship and honored at the Bantayog ng mga Bayani
 Marco Sison – Singer
 Fermin Torralba – Secretary of the Philippine Senate (1931–1935)
 Isagani Yambot – Journalist
 Vanessa Sarno – Medalist, Weightlifting

Notes

References

Sources

External links

 [ Philippine Standard Geographic Code]
 
 Provincial Government of Bohol

 
Cities in Central Visayas
Populated places in Bohol
Provincial capitals of the Philippines
Port cities and towns in the Philippines
Component cities in the Philippines